Tara Williams may refer to:

Tara Williams (basketball) (born 1974) former professional basketball player
Tara Williams, character from Sue Thomas: F.B.Eye
Tara Williams, character from The Saga of Darren Shan
Tara Williams, character from This Life